Benjamin Davis (born 6 September 1961) is a British cinematographer. His major works include Kick-Ass (2010), Hannibal Rising (2007) and the Marvel Studios films Guardians of the Galaxy (2014), Avengers: Age of Ultron (2015), Doctor Strange (2016), Captain Marvel (2019) and Eternals (2021). He has collaborated with Matthew Vaughn on four films and Martin McDonagh on three films, including Three Billboards Outside Ebbing, Missouri .

Davis started his career at Samuelsons Camera House, now a part of the motion picture equipment company Panavision. He worked as clapper loader, focus puller, and camera operator in both feature films and commercials. During this period he worked with Billy Williams, Douglas Slocombe and Roger Deakins. He began his career as a cinematographer shooting spots. His first major feature film as a cinematographer was the 2002 British film Miranda.

His father was cinematographer and camera operator Mike Davis. He is married to writer and director Camille Griffin. Their son is actor Roman Griffin Davis.

Filmography

References

External links 
 Official Website
 

1961 births
Living people
British cinematographers
English cinematographers